Acanthocoris scabrator is a species commonly known as squash bugs. It is a known pest insect of squash, eggplant, mango, red pepper, and gooseberry, and lays eggs on Ipomoea carnea.

References

Coreidae
Insects described in 1803
Taxa named by Johan Christian Fabricius